Claude Joseph Goldsmid Montefiore, also Goldsmid–Montefiore or just Goldsmid Montefiore  (1858–1938) was the intellectual founder of Anglo-Liberal Judaism and the founding president of the World Union for Progressive Judaism, a scholar of the Hebrew Bible, rabbinic literature and New Testament. He was a significant figure in the contexts of modern Jewish religious thought, Jewish-Christian relations, and Anglo-Jewish socio-politics, and educator. Montefiore was President of the Anglo-Jewish Association and an influential anti-Zionist leader, who co-founded the anti-Zionist League of British Jews in 1917.

Family
Claude Montefiore was the youngest son of Nathaniel Montefiore and Emma Goldsmid. He had two sisters, Alice Julia and Charlotte Rosalind and one brother, Leonard (1853-1879). He was the great-nephew of Sir Moses Montefiore.

Montefiore's first wife was Therese Alice Schorstein, who had been a student at Girton College, Cambridge. She died in 1889 and, two years later, he endowed a prize in her memory – the Therese Montefiore Memorial Prize. Their son was Leonard G. Montefiore.  Montefiore remarried at the West London Synagogue on 24 July 1902.  His second wife was Florence Fyfe Brereton Ward, daughter of Richard James Ward, and a Vice-Mistress at Girton, having started there as Librarian.

Education
Part of Montefiore's childhood was spent at his family's Coldeast estate in Sarisbury Green, Hampshire.

He was educated at Balliol College, Oxford, where he obtained a first-class honours degree in the classical final examination, and where he came under the influence of Benjamin Jowett and T. H. Green. Intended originally for the ministry of the West London Synagogue, he studied theology in Berlin, but finding himself unable to sympathise with the arrest of the Reform Movement, he devoted himself instead to scholarly and philanthropic pursuits. He nevertheless continued to be a spiritual teacher and preacher, though in a lay capacity, and published a volume of sermons, in conjunction with Israel Abrahams, entitled "Aspects of Judaism" (London, 1894). In 1886, he was selected by the Hibbert Trustees to deliver their course of lectures for 1892 ("The Origin of Religion as Illustrated by the Ancient Hebrews"). In these lectures, Montefiore made a permanent contribution to the science of theology. In 1896, he published the first volume of his "Bible for Home Reading," forming a commentary on the Bible with moral reflections from the standpoint of the "higher criticism"; the second volume appeared in 1899. In 1888 Montefiore founded and edited, in conjunction with Israel Abrahams, the "Jewish Quarterly Review", a journal that stood on the very highest level of contemporary Jewish scholarship, and in which numerous contributions from his pen have appeared.

Teachings and positions

Among Jewish religious leaders, Montefiore was unusual for the time and energy he devoted to the study of Christianity. He provoked considerable controversy for what was perceived by many to be an overly sympathetic attitude towards Jesus and Paul of Tarsus. Inter alia, he wrote a two-volume commentary on the Synoptic gospels in the early part of the twentieth century, What A Jew Thinks about Jesus, published in 1935, and Judaism and St. Paul (1914).

He assisted Rev. Simeon Singer in preparing the standard Anglo-Jewish prayer book. This was acknowledged in the original preface, but his name was removed from the preface of the second edition.

Montefiore was one of the leading authorities on questions of education. Montefiore was mainly instrumental in enabling Jewish pupil teachers at elementary schools to enjoy the advantages of training in classes held for the purpose at the universities.

Montefiore showed great sympathy with all liberal tendencies in Jewish religious movements in London and was president of the Jewish Religious Union. He was president of the Jewish Historical Society of England in 1899–1900.

He ranked as one of the leading philanthropists in the Anglo-Jewish community and held office in various important bodies.

Group involvement
As a revered scholar, philanthropist and spiritual authority, Claude Montefiore belongs to that important group of learned laymen who have sought to revolutionise Judaism. He was a founder of British Liberal Judaism at the turn of the 20th century, considered to be the most original Anglo-Jewish religious thinker of his day, and still remains a highly controversial figure. Montefiore infuriated his enemies and often alienated his supporters with his radical agenda in which he applied the findings of historical and literary analysis to the Jewish scriptures, attempted to radically systemise rabbinic thought, and by his desire to learn from and re-express aspects of Christian theology. The extent to which he incorporated the teachings of Jesus and Paul into his own ethical and theological musings makes him unique among Jewish reformers. In his dealings with Christians and Christian thought, he can also be regarded as a forerunner to those who would later fully partake in Jewish-Christian dialogue.

Functions 

Member of the School Board for London
President of the Froebel Society and the Jews' Infant School, London (1904), and a member of numerous other educational bodies.
Member of the council of Jews' College
Member of the Jewish Religious Education Board
Acting President of University College Southampton (1910-1913) and the President from 1913 to 1934.
President of the Anglo-Jewish Association (1892-1921)
Member of the Council of the Jewish Colonization Association.

Works 
 The Hibbert Lectures; On the Origin and Growth of Religion as Illustrated by the Religion of the Ancient Hebrews (London: Williams & Norgate, 1893).
 The Bible for Home Reading (London: Macmillan, 1899).
 Some Elements in the Religious Teaching of Jesus (London: Macmillan, 1910).
 Outlines of Liberal Judaism (London: Macmillan, 1912).
 Judaism and St. Paul; Two Essays (London: Max Goschen Ltd, 1914).
 Liberal Judaism and Hellenism and Other Essays (London: Macmillan, 1918).
 Race, nation, religion and the Jews (Keiley: Rydal Press, 1918)
 The Old Testament and After (London: Macmillan, 1923).
 The Synoptic Gospels, 2nd edn, 2 vols (London: Macmillan, 1927).
 Studies in Memory of Israel Abrahams (New York: Jewish Institute of Religion, 1927).
 Rabbinic Literature and Gospel Teachings (London: Macmillan, 1930).
 The Synoptic Gospels (New York: K.T.A.V. Publishing House, 1968), with ‘Prolegomenon’ by Lou H Silberman.
 A Rabbinic Anthology (ed., w. Herbert Loewe, London: Macmillan, 1938).

References 

Daniel Langton, Claude Montefiore: His Life and Thought (London: Vallentine Mitchell Press, 2002).
Dunia Garcia-Ontiveros, Treasures from the London Library: Claude Montefiore: a cautious revolutionary, History Today, http://www.historytoday.com/dunia-garcia-ontiveros/treasures-london-library-claude-montefiore-cautious-revolutionary
Edward Kessler, Claude Montefiore and Liberal Judaism, European Judaism, Vol. 34, No. 1  
Steven Bayme, Claude Montefiore, Lily Montagu and the Origins of the Jewish Religious Union, Jewish Historical Society of England, Vol. 27, (1978–1980), pp. 61–71

External links 

 

1858 births
1938 deaths
Anti-Zionist Jews
English Sephardi Jews
English educational theorists
Liberal Judaism (United Kingdom)
Claude
Hochschule für die Wissenschaft des Judentums alumni